In algebraic number theory, an algebraic integer is a complex number which is integral over the integers. That is, an algebraic integer is a complex root of some monic polynomial (a polynomial whose leading coefficient is 1) whose coefficients are integers. The set of all algebraic integers  is closed under addition, subtraction and multiplication and therefore is a commutative subring of the complex numbers.

Each algebraic integer belongs to the ring of integers of some number field. A number  is an algebraic integer if and only if the ring  is finitely generated as an abelian group, which is to say, as a -module.

Definitions

The following are equivalent definitions of an algebraic integer.

  is an algebraic integer if there exists a monic polynomial  such that .
  is an algebraic integer if  is a finitely generated -module.
  is an algebraic integer if there exists a non-zero finitely generated -submodule  such that .

Algebraic integers are a special case of integral elements of a ring extension. In particular, an algebraic integer is an integral element of a finite extension .

Examples
 The only algebraic integers which are found in the set of rational numbers are the integers. The rational number  is not an algebraic integer unless  divides . Note that the leading coefficient of the polynomial  is the integer . As another special case, the square root  of a nonnegative integer  is an algebraic integer, but is irrational unless  is a perfect square.
If  is a square-free integer then the extension  is a quadratic field of rational numbers. The ring of algebraic integers  contains  since this is a root of the monic polynomial . Moreover, if , then the element  is also an algebraic integer. It satisfies the polynomial  where the constant term  is an integer. See Quadratic integer for more.
 If  is a primitive th root of unity, then the ring of integers of the cyclotomic field  is precisely .
 If  is an algebraic integer then  is another algebraic integer.

Non-example

Facts
 The sum, difference and product of two algebraic integers is an algebraic integer. In general their quotient is not. The monic polynomial involved is generally of higher degree than those of the original algebraic integers, and can be found by taking resultants and factoring.
 Any number constructible out of the integers with roots, addition, and multiplication is therefore an algebraic integer; but not all algebraic integers are so constructible: in a naïve sense, most roots of irreducible quintics are not. This is the Abel–Ruffini theorem. 
 Every root of a monic polynomial whose coefficients are algebraic integers is itself an algebraic integer. In other words, the algebraic integers form a ring which is integrally closed in any of its extensions.
 The ring of algebraic integers is a Bézout domain, as a consequence of the principal ideal theorem.
 If the monic polynomial associated with an algebraic integer has constant term 1 or −1, then the reciprocal of that algebraic integer is also an algebraic integer, and is a unit, an element of the group of units of the ring of algebraic integers.
 Every algebraic number can be written as the ratio of an algebraic integer to a non-zero algebraic integer. In fact, the denominator can always be chosen to be a positive integer. Specifically, if  is an algebraic number that is a root of the polynomial  with integer coefficients and leading term  for  then  is the promised ratio.

See also
Integral element
Gaussian integer
Eisenstein integer
Root of unity
Dirichlet's unit theorem
Fundamental units

References

 

Algebraic numbers
Integers